Minilimosina is a genus of flies belonging to the family Lesser Dung flies.

Species
Subgenus Allolimosina Roháček, 1983
M. albinervis (Duda, 1918)
M. alloneura (Richards, 1952)
M. paralbinervis (Papp, 1973)
M. pseudoalbinervis (Papp, 1973)
M. rotundipennis (Malloch, 1913)
M. secundaria (Duda, 1918)
Subgenus Amediella Papp, 2008
M. endrodyi Papp, 2008
Subgenus Amputella Marshall, 1985
M. bistylus Marshall, 1985
M. curvistylus Marshall, 1985
M. digitata Marshall, 1985
M. erecta Marshall, 1985
M. priapismus Marshall, 1985
M. ternaria Marshall, 1985
Subgenus Minilimosina Roháček, 1983
M. accinta Marshall, 1985
M. baculum Marshall, 1985
M. bicuspis Roháček, 1993
M. caelator Roháček, 1988
M. curvispina Carles-Tolrá, 2001
M. fungicola (Haliday, 1836)
M. gemella Roháček, 1983
M. hispidula Roháček, 1988
M. intermedia Marshall, 1985
M. knightae (Harrison, 1959)
M. kozaneki (Kuznetzova, 1991)
M. lepida Marshall, 1985
M. longisternum Marshall, 1985
M. meszarosi (Papp, 1974)
M. microtophila (Papp, 1973)
M. nasuta (Spuler, 1925)
M. parafungicola (Papp, 1974)
M. parva (Malloch, 1913)
M. parvula (Stenhammar, 1855)
M. pulpa Marshall, 1985
M. rohaceki (Papp, 1978)
M. sclerophallus Marshall, 1985
M. similissima (Papp, 1974)
M. sitka Marshall in Marshall & Winchester, 1999
M. tenera Roháček, 1983
M. trogeri Roháček, 1983
M. tuberculum Marshall, 1985
M. zeda Marshall, 1985
Subgenus Sagittaliseta Papp, 2008
M. siamensis Papp, 2008
Subgenus Svarciella Roháček, 1983

M. amphicuspa Roháček & Marshall, 1988
M. archboldi Marshall, 1985
M. bartaki Roháček, 2010
M. bipara Marshall, 1985
M. brachyptera Roháček & Marshall, 1988
M. concinna Roháček & Marshall, 1988
M. contrasta Marshall, 1985
M. cornigera Roháček & Marshall, 1988
M. dissimilicosta (Spuler, 1925)
M. egena Roháček, 1992
M. fanta Roháček & Marshall, 1988
M. flagrella Roháček & Marshall, 1988
M. floreni Roháček & Marshall, 1985
M. furculipexa Roháček & Marshall, 1988
M. furculisterna (Deeming, 1969)
M. guestphalica (Duda, 1918)
M. hastata Roháček & Marshall, 1988
M. intercepta Marshall, 1985
M. ismayi Roháček, 1983
M. niveipennis (Malloch, 1913)
M. pujadei Carles-Tolrá, 2001
M. puncticorpoides (Papp, 1973)
M. spinifera Roháček & Marshall, 1988
M. triplex Roháček & Marshall, 1988
M. unica (Papp, 1973)
M. v-atrum (Villeneuve, 1917)
M. vitripennis (Zetterstedt, 1847)
M. vixa Marshall, 1985
M. xanthosceles Roháček & Marshall, 1988
M. xestops Roháček & Marshall, 1988

References

Sphaeroceridae
Diptera of Asia
Diptera of Africa
Diptera of North America
Diptera of South America
Diptera of Europe
Diptera of Australasia
Brachycera genera